Bom Jesus do Amparo is a Brazilian municipality in the state of Minas Gerais. The city is part of the mesoregion Metropolitana de Belo Horizonte and the microregion of Itabira. As of 2020, the estimated population was 6,133.

See also
 List of municipalities in Minas Gerais

References

Municipalities in Minas Gerais